Isocoma pluriflora, commonly called southern jimmyweed or southern goldenbush, is a North American species of flowering perennial herbs in the family Asteraceae.  It grows in northern Mexico (Baja California Sur, Sonora, Chihuahua, Coahuila, Nuevo León) and in the southwestern and south-central United States (Arizona, New Mexico, Colorado and Texas).

Leaves are narrow, up to 5 cm (2 inches) long. The plant produces numerous flower heads in a cluster at the top of the stem, each head with 8-21 yellow disc flowers but no ray flowers. The species is named "pluriflora", 'many flowered', for its up to 25-50 vertical and approximately parallel stalks, tipped with yellow golden flower heads.

References

External links
photo of herbarium specimen at Missouri Botanical Garden, collected in western Texas in 1849

pluriflora
Flora of the Chihuahuan Desert
Flora of Arizona
Flora of Chihuahua (state)
Flora of New Mexico
Flora of Texas
North American desert flora
Plants described in 1842
Taxa named by Asa Gray
Taxa named by John Torrey